bTV Cinema is a Bulgarian television channel, showing movies and serials. It is part of bTV Media Group, owned by CME (Central European Media Enterprises). The channel starts on 7 December 2009.bTV Cinema is aimed at viewers of all ages with an emphasis on active audiences aged 18–49 years. The program of bTV Cinema includes hit films and TV series als of all genres. Viewers can also see samples of European cinema. It also shows already aired Bulgarian serials such as Glass Home, Seven Hours Difference and Revolution Z.
Since 2012 bTV Cinema shows live prizes like the Oscars, Golden Globe Awards and more. Since 7 October 2012 the format of the picture is set to 16:9.

Television networks in Bulgaria
Bulgarian-language television stations
Television channels and stations established in 2009